Dilara Zaman (born 19 June 1943) is a Bangladeshi film and television actress. She was awarded Ekushey Padak in 1993 and Bangladesh National Film Award for Best Supporting Actress in 2008.

Early life and education
Dilara Zaman was born on 19 June 1943 in Bardhaman District in British India to Rafiquddin Ahmed and Sitara Begum. Her family then moved to Asansol. After the partition of India in 1947 they finally moved to Jessore. She studied in Bangla Bazar Government Girls High School in Dhaka.  She acted her first stage play in this school. She went on to study in Eden College. She was under the mentorship of her Guru Natyaguru Professor Nurul Momen. She was a master's student of Bangla at the University of Dhaka.

Personal life
Hi Zaman was married to Fakhruzzaman Chowdhury in 1966. They have two daughters, Tanira and Zubayra. Her niece was an actress Tazin Ahmed.

Career
Zaman started acting in theatre in 1962. Her first play was Mayabi Prohor, scripted by Alauddin Al-Azad. In 1966, she acted her first television drama Tridhara, directed by Tahmina Banu. She was also a school teacher of Chattogram Cantonment Public College from 1973-1980
 She acted in numerous Bengali films and dramas over the course of 40 years. They include The Wheel, Chandragrohon. She became a school instructor in 1967 and stayed in the job until 1993.

Works

Television

Films 
 Raat Jaga Phool (2021)

Awards
 Ekushey Padak
 Bangladesh National Film Award for Best Supporting Actress (2008)

References

External links
 

Living people
1943 births
University of Dhaka alumni
Eden Mohila College alumni
Bangladeshi film actresses
Bangladeshi television actresses
Recipients of the Ekushey Padak
Best Supporting Actress National Film Award (Bangladesh) winners
Chittagong Cantonment Public College alumni